Calvino is a crater on Mercury. Its name was adopted by the IAU in 2016, after the Italian writer Italo Calvino.

Calvino lies in the center of Sihtu Planitia, and Rūdaki crater is to the east.

Views

References

Italo Calvino
Impact craters on Mercury